Reel Life may refer to:

Reel Life (Boy Meets Girl album)
Reel Life (Sonny Rollins album)
Reel Life Productions, a record label
 Reel Life, an album by Will Taylor
 Reel Life, an album by Trout Fishing in America
Reel Life, Vol. 1, an album by Wild Colonials

See also
 Real Life (disambiguation)